Christopher Phillips (born July 15, 1959) is an American author, educator, consultant, lecturer, and pro-democracy advocate. He is best known for his 2001 book Socrates Café. Public Radio International called Phillips the "Johnny Appleseed of Philosophy."

Phillips's latest book A Child at Heart: Unlocking Your Creativity, Curiosity and Reason at Every Age and Stage of Life was published in March 2018. Foreword Reviews and Adam Braun both praised it.

Early life and education
According to Phillips, he read Plato's Socratic dialogues when he was about 12. After graduating from Menchville High School, he received a BA in Government from the College of William & Mary; In 1997, he earned an M.A.T. in Teaching from Montclair State University, and studied in the Institute for the Advancement of Philosophy for Children. In 2000, he earned an M.A. external degree in Humanities, with an emphasis in philosophy, at California State University, Dominguez Hills; He also has a Master of Science in natural sciences degree from Delta State University, which was the first of his master's degrees. Phillips received a PhD in communications from Edith Cowan University in Australia.

Cafés
Phillips was a school teacher and newspaper reporter, then editorial consultant and freelancer for national magazines, before starting Socrates cafes, Socratic discussion meetings in a variety of venues such as cafés, nursing homes, churches, schools (where the gatherings are sometimes called Philosophers' Club, also the name of his first children's book), and prisons. Phillips' idea of having open-invitation meetings in cafes to discuss philosophy was inspired in part by Matthew Lipman, the founder of the Institute for the Advancement of Philosophy for Children who advocated introducing philosophy into schools and under whom Phillips studied, as well as by Marc Sautet, whose Café Philosophique Phillips became aware of after reading an article about Sautet while teaching in the Mississippi Delta.
In his penultimate book "Constitution Café", Phillips details a journey across the US promoting discussions with a version of the Socratic Method that he developed for the Socrates Cafés, combined with the Jeffersonian idea of democratic freedom and inclusiveness. He has since worked on the Declaration Project, a comprehensive collection of declarations of independence, causes, rights, and principles from across the ages and continents, as well as the Constitutional Cafe and the Democracy Cafe initiatives that discuss constitutional changes in the United States. Phillips also founded a for-profit consulting service, Socrates Group.

Academic career
Phillips was a 2012 recipient of the Distinguished American Leadership Award, along with Adam Braun, founder of Pencils of Promise. Phillips has also taught in the graduate program Media, Culture and Communication at New York University, and at the University of Pennsylvania as a Senior Writing Fellow. He has been Senior Education Fellow at the National Constitution Center and 2014–15 Network Fellow at the Edmond J. Safra Center for Ethics at Harvard University. He also blogs the SocratesCafe.com site and writes occasionally for the Zocalo Public Square.

Published works

Books
The books published by Phillips are (the ISBNs refer to paperback editions, where available):

 Constitution Cafe: Jefferson's Brew for a True Revolution (W.W. Norton, 2011)
 Socrates in Love: Philosophy for a Die-Hard Romantic (W.W. Norton, 2007)
 Six Questions of Socrates: A Modern-Day Journey of Discovery through World Philosophy (W.W. Norton, 2004)
 Socrates Café: A Fresh Taste of Philosophy (W.W. Norton, 2001)
 A Child at Heart: Unlocking Your Creativity, Curiosity and Reason at Every Age and Stage of Life (Skyhorse, 2018), 
 Ceci Ann's Day of Why (Penguin Random House, 2006)
 The Philosophers' Club (Penguin Random House, 2004)

Papers
Phillips wrote, among many others, the following papers:
 "Coalition" M/C Journal, Vol. 13, No. 6 (2010)
 "The Austrian Philosopher Who Showed that Words Can Spark Humanism – Or Barbarism"," Zocalo Public Square, January 31, 2018
 "Philosophical Counseling: An Ancient Practice Is Being Rejuvenated," Thinking: The Journal of Philosophy for Children, Vol. 14, Issue 1, 1998, pp. 48–49
 "Daring to Revise America's Sacred Text", San Francisco Chronicle, Opinion Page, July 3, 2017
 "Socratic Inquiry for All Ages", Vol. 8, No. 15, 2012, Childhood & Philosophy
 "Why aren't kids part of 'All men are created equal'?", Huffington Post, December 9, 2014
 "Live Like Picasso: Nurturing Fluid Intelligence and an 'Artistic Dimension", Huffington Post, December 19, 2014
 "The Efficacy of the Lipmanian Approach to Teaching Philosophy for Children", Childhood & Philosophy, Vol. 7, No. 13, 2011

See also
 Socrates Café
 Socratic dialogue
Walter Kaufmann
Matthew Lipman
Justus Buchler

References

External links
 ChristopherPhillips.com official website

1959 births
20th-century American philosophers
21st-century American philosophers
College of William & Mary alumni
Montclair State University alumni
Living people